Lezyne is a manufacturer of bicycle accessories headquartered in Reno, Nevada, with offices in San Luis Obispo, Berlin and Taichung. The company is known for producing pumps, multi-tools, saddle bags, bottle cages, lights and GPS cyclocomputers. Most of their products are manufactured in-house at their factory in Taichung, Taiwan. In addition to selling products in the aftermarket, Lezyne is an original equipment manufacturer for electric bicycle lights.

History 
Lezyne was founded by Micki Kozuschek on March 1, 2007. The original product line consisted of hand pumps, multi-tools, tire repair items, saddle bags and hydration packs.

In 2011, Lezyne released a lineup of LED bicycle lights.

In 2015, the company announced their first line of GPS cycling computers along with a supporting mobile app and data analysis website.

In 2018, Lezyne won three Design & Innovation Awards for their Classic Brass Bell, Digital Micro Floor Drive HV pump, and Laser Drive taillight.

In 2019, Lezyne released a mobile app which can be used to wirelessly control and program select LED lights.

Sponsorship 
In addition to manufacturing accessories, Lezyne also supports and receives product feedback from notable cycling teams and individual athletes including:

 Danny Macaskill
 Cédric Gracia
 Lotto Soudal
 AG2R La Mondiale Pro Cycling Team
 Alison Tetrick
 Team DSM
 And others

See also 

 Park Tool

References

External links 
Lezyne Website

Bicycle tool manufacturers
Cycle parts manufacturers
Cycle manufacturers of the United States
Tool manufacturing companies of the United States
Companies based in Reno, Nevada